Zilpha is a given name. Notable people with the name include:

Zilpha Drew Smith (1852–1926), American social worker
Zilpha Elaw (c. 1790 – 1873), American Methodist missionary and writer
Zilpha Grant (1919–2011), English freestyle swimmer who competed for Great Britain in the 1936 Summer Olympics
Zilpha Keatley Snyder (born 1927), author of books for children and young adults